CFDY-FM is a Canadian radio station that broadcasts a community radio format at 104.7 FM in Cochrane, Ontario.

History

In November 2007, an application by the Cochrane Polar Bear Radio Club, to operate a new community FM radio station at Cochrane was denied. The Cochrane Polar Bear Radio Club reapplied in January 2008 and received approval to operate the station at 104.7 MHz with 5 watts of power on August 1, 2008.

The station, CFDY-FM is owned by the Cochrane Polar Bear Radio Club. The callsign for meaning for CFDY is "Douglas W. Young", the program director of the station.

On December 13, 2010, the Cochrane Polar Bear Radio Club applied to operate a new FM radio station at Cochrane on the frequency of 104.7 MHz. This application to operate the new station at Cochrane received CRTC approval on April 20, 2011.

On January 28, 2011, the Cochrane Polar Bear Radio Club applied to operate a new FM radio station at Smooth Rock Falls, Ontario on the frequency of 88.5 MHz and received approval on November 10, 2011. The callsign for 88.5 FM at Smooth Rock Falls will be CHDY-FM.

References

External links
Cochrane Polar Bear Radio (CPBRFM)
 
 (104.7 FM Cochrane, Ontario)
 (88.5 FM Smooth Rock Falls, Ontario)

Fdy
Fdy
Cochrane, Ontario
Radio stations established in 2008
2008 establishments in Ontario